On 18 June 2017, a United States Navy F/A-18E shot down a Syrian Air Force Su-22 Fitter with an AIM-120 AMRAAM missile after it reportedly attacked Kurdish Syrian Democratic Forces positions in the town of Ja'Din. It was the first time the U.S. shot down a manned aircraft since 1999 and the first with the F/A-18E/F variant.

The downing triggered quick condemnation from Russia and Syria with both nations claiming it to be a violation of international law and Syrian sovereignty. The Syrian pilot, Captain Ali Fahd, successfully ejected from his aircraft and was found alive by Syrian troops one day later in the village of Shuwaihat. The F/A-18E pilot, Lieutenant Commander Michael Tremel was awarded the Distinguished Flying Cross in September 2018 for his actions during the incident.

Background 
The United States and other Coalition partners began combat operations in Syria on 23 September 2014 against the Islamic State of Iraq and the Levant and al-Nusra Front. Before operations began the Syrian Government stated that "any action of any kind without the consent of the Syrian Government would be an attack on Syria". However, when the first airstrikes began the Syrian military did not respond and set radar to passive. Syria's foreign minister later suggested that Syria and the US-led Coalition were on the same side. The Coalition wouldn't attack Syrian Military positions until September 2016 when warplanes from the United States, Australia, Denmark, and the United Kingdom launched 37 airstrikes on Syrian forces in Deir ez-Zor Airport killing 106 soldiers. In response Syria canceled a ceasefire forged by diplomats from the United States and Russia. The Coalition claimed it had misidentified the Syrian soldiers as ISIL militants while Syria claimed it as a deliberate attack.

In April 2017, the first deliberate military action against the Syrian Arab Republic occurred when the United States bombed the Shayrat Airbase in response to the Shaykun chemical attack. Two months later on 6 June, the United States conducted airstrikes on pro-government forces, killing an unknown number of fighters. Two days later, an American F-15E shot down an Iranian operated drone. Because of these events the rules of engagement were constantly changing. Sometime before June the USS George H.W. Bush aircraft carrier deployed to the Eastern Mediterranean Sea South of Crete. During the carrier's operations the fighter crews were told to be ready to defend from a third party aerial attack, due to all the recent events that had occurred.

Incident 
Earlier in the day on 18 June, Syrian Regime forces attacked SDF positions in Ja'Din, wounding several fighters, prompting Coalition aircraft to respond with a "show of force", stopping the attack. Several airstrikes also had been conducted by pilots on board the George H.W. Bush on ISIL targets in Syria.  After their pre-mission briefing, F/A-18E pilots Lieutenant Commander Michael "Mob" Tremel (call sign - Freedom 33) and wingman Jeff Krueger (call sign - Freedom 34) were sent out as the second wave of aircraft from the carrier into Syria that day. Alongside Tremel and his wingman were two F/A-18Cs, William Vuillet and Stephen Gasecki were Freedom 43 and 44. The four fighters took the Northern route alongside Syria's coastline through Russian and Turkish air defense range and headed toward the city of Raqqa. Once over the city they established communication with the Joint Terminal Air Controller who was on the ground just South of Al-Tabqa. They entered into close air support overhead the air controller and began waiting for any strikes to be called in from friendly SDF forces fighting on the ground. During this time, a Russian Air Force Su-27 appeared and began flying overhead.

Shoot down
Tremel, who was having problems with his targeting pod, began tracking the Russian jet, as well as checking his radar for any more aircraft while the three others stayed in close air support mode. At this point, another aircraft appeared on his radar moving at high speed. Tremel, believing it to be Syrian, moved to intercept and identified it as a Syrian Air Force Su-22 Fitter. Upon identification, Tremel got on radio with an airborne command and control post, and began sending warnings to the Syrian aircraft to divert its course. When that failed, Tremel flew over the Fitter's canopy and shot off flares. When that also failed, the Su-22 was in range of friendly forces on the ground, and at 6:43 p.m. local time, dived down and dropped ordnance on SDF fighters in the town of Ja'Din, causing injuries. Following the rules of engagement, Tremel locked onto the aircraft with an AIM-9 Sidewinder and fired. The Su-22 shot off flares and was able to successfully avoid the missile. Tremel then quickly locked on with an AIM-120 AMRAAM missile and fired at the Syrian aircraft, successfully reaching the Fitter and blowing up on the jet's backside.

The Syrian Army claimed that the Su-22 was on a mission to strike Daesh (ISIL) when the downing occurred.

Aftermath 
The Su-22 began violently shaking as it fell to the ground. The Syrian pilot Captain Ali Fahd was able to successfully eject before the plane could explode, and turned on his emergency transponder. Tremel and his wingman were now deep in enemy air defense range with the Russian Su-27 still overhead. With clearance from the Joint Terminal Air Controller, they began to exit the area. A nearby KC-10 Extender was able to refuel the fighters and give a quick moment of clarity after the tense situation. Tremel and his wingman were cleared to head back to the carrier, of which they took the route through Iraq instead. The two F/A-18Cs were ordered to provide close air support for Iraqi forces fighting the Islamic State in Mosul. During this time, the two F/A-18Cs conducted airstrikes before finally returning to the George H.W. Bush.

Immediately after the shoot down, clashes broke out between Regime forces and Coalition backed Syrian Democratic Forces near Al-Resafa, according to the Syrian Observatory for Human Rights (SOHR).

Following the downing, the SDF withdrew from Ja’Din after being attacked by pro-regime militiamen according to The Pentagon.

Captain Ali Fahd, the pilot of the Su-22 was found alive in the village of Shuwaihat by regime forces the next day.

Two days after the shoot down, a US F-15 fighter jet shot down another Iranian operated Shahed 129 armed drone in the same area where the Su-22 was brought down, making it the third aircraft shoot down of a pro-regime aircraft that month.

In September 2017, at a Tailhook Association panel, the Hornet and Super Hornet pilots involved in the incident gave a moment by moment eyewitness account of what led to, and happened during, and after the incident.

Reactions 
 A statement put out by the US-led Coalition stated "The coalition does not seek to fight Syrian regime, Russian or pro-regime forces partnered with them but will not hesitate to defend coalition or partner forces from any threat. The demonstrated hostile intent and actions of pro-regime forces toward coalition and partner forces in Syria conducting legitimate counter-ISIS operations will not be tolerated." 
 A statement released by the Syrian Army stated "Flagrant attack was an attempt to undermine the efforts of the army as the only effective force capable with its allies ...in fighting terrorism across its territory. This comes at a time when the Syrian army and its allies were making clear advances in fighting Daesh (Islamic State) terrorist group." On state run media, the Syrian Army also said that the Su-22 was on a mission to strike IS-forces when it came under fire.
 The Russian Government quickly condemned the downing and took immediate action by temporary suspending its hotline with the US Coalition. The Russian MoD viewed it as blatant aggression towards Syria stating "Syrian air force aircraft destroying American aviation in Syrian airspace, cynical violation of the sovereignty of the Syrian Arab Republic. Repeated Hostilities Aviation USA under the guise of "fighting terrorism" against the legitimate armed forces United Nations Member States, are a flagrant violation of international law and in fact military aggression towards the Syrian Arab Republic." Russia also threatened that Coalition aircraft West of the Euphrates River were now considered potential targets.
 Australia suspended its airstrikes in Syria in response to rising tensions between the US and Russia over the downing and in precaution to the Russian threat that any Coalition aircraft flying West of the Euphrates River would be a "potential target".

See also 
2015 Russian Sukhoi Su-24 shootdown
List of aviation shootdowns and accidents during the Syrian Civil War

References 

21st-century aircraft shootdown incidents
Aviation accidents and incidents in Syria
June 2017 events in Syria
Air-to-air combat operations and battles
Accidents and incidents involving military aircraft
Military operations of the Syrian civil war involving the United States
Military operations of the Syrian civil war involving the Syrian government
2017 disasters in Syria